Charlie Gaddy (born September 17, 1931), is a former American television anchorman for WRAL-TV from Raleigh, North Carolina. He anchored the evening news for over 20 years.  He retired in 1994.

Biography
Gaddy was born in Roxboro, North Carolina in 1931. He is a graduate of Guilford College. His first appearance on television was as staff announcer with NBC in 1960. He subsequently worked for radio station WPTF for ten years. In his 30s, he moved to Raleigh when he joined WRAL-TV in 1970 to host Good Morning Charlie Four years later, he joined the Action News 5 team with Bobbie Battista, Bob DeBardelaben and Rich Brenner. In 1981 Battista accepted an offer with CNN, Atlanta, and Gaddy became the solo anchor until Adele Arakawa joined in 1983 and Tom Suiter became the new sports anchor in 1982. On July 1, 1994, Gaddy retired from WRAL-TV after 24 years. In 2006, he joined a reunion newscast with Battista, DeBardelaben and Tom Suiter, although he has appeared on WRAListens.

The Charlie Gaddy Center for Children was named in honor of Gaddy's public service in support of United Cerebral Palsy of North Carolina.

Gaddy was named to the Mid-South Emmy Award Silver Circle

References

1931 births
People from Raleigh, North Carolina
People from Biscoe, North Carolina
American television news anchors
Living people